The Copa del Generalísimo 1952 Final was the 50th final of the King's Cup. The finals was played at Estadio Chamartín in Madrid, on 25 May 1952, being won by CF Barcelona, who beat Valencia CF 4-2 after extra time.

Details

References

1952
Copa
FC Barcelona matches
Valencia CF matches